Science for the Satanic Citizen is a 1990 album by Leæther Strip, released by Zoth Ommog. It incorporates a number of samples from films, including Hellraiser.

Track listing
 "Zyklon B"
 "G.A.W.M."
 "Rotation (Axis Off)"
 "Satanic Citizen"
 "What's Hell Really Like?"
 "Law of Jante"
CD bonus tracks:
 "Cast-away"
 "Torment Me"

"The Law of Jante" is Leæther Strip's first (and only until his 2005 comeback) song in Danish. It features a reading of the Jante Law from Aksel Sandemose's book En flygtning krydser sit spor.

References

1990 albums
Leæther Strip albums
Zoth Ommog Records albums